Mongolia–South Korea relations are foreign relations between South Korea and the Mongolia.  Both countries established diplomatic relations on March 26, 1990. South Korea has an embassy in Ulaanbaatar.  Mongolia has an embassy in Seoul.

Mongolians in South Korea form the largest population of Mongolian citizens abroad. Their numbers were estimated at 33,000 . There are also about 3,500 South Koreans in Mongolia. Under a bilateral agreement signed in 2006, citizens of each country residing in the other are exempted from otherwise-mandatory contributions to the national pension plans of the country they reside in.

See also 
 Mongol invasions of Korea
 Mongolia–North Korea relations
 
 
 
 Altaic languages

References

External links 
  South Korean Ministry of Foreign Affairs and Trade about relations with Mongolia
  South Korean embassy in Ulaanbaatar

 

 
Bilateral relations of South Korea
Korea, South